Alex Bruce (born 28 October 1998) is an English footballer who plays as a forward for V.League 1 club Hồ Chí Minh City.

Career
Bruce played with youth side Texans SC Houston during their 2016–17 season, where he scored 17 goals in 29 appearances. On 10 January 2018, Bruce signed for the United Soccer League side San Antonio FC.

On 6 December 2019, Bruce joined North Texas SC.

References

External links
 
 
 

1998 births
Living people
Association football forwards
English expatriate footballers
English expatriate sportspeople in the United States
English footballers
Expatriate soccer players in the United States
Lansing Ignite FC players
People from Katy, Texas
Soccer players from Texas
Footballers from Gateshead
Sportspeople from Harris County, Texas
San Antonio FC players
USL Championship players
USL League One players
North Texas SC players
Union Omaha players